Befri dig selv is the second studio album by Danish pop singer and songwriter Basim. It was released in Denmark on 19 October 2009. The album peaked at number 21 on the Danish Albums Chart. The album includes the singles "Befri dig selv" and "Baby"

Singles
 "Befri dig selv" was released as the lead single from the album on 18 September 2009.

Track listing

Chart performance

Weekly charts

Release history

References

2009 albums
Basim (singer) albums